Danny Darnell Carr (born 1970) is the District Attorney of Jefferson County, Alabama, serving since November 27, 2018. Carr previously served as the county's interim district attorney in 2017. He is the first African-American District Attorney in the Birmingham division of the Jefferson County, Alabama District Attorney’s office.

Life and career 

Carr was born in the Ensley neighborhood of Birmingham, Alabama. He was raised by a single mother, Regina Carr-Hope, who worked as a probation officer and later the Principal of Wenonah High School. Carr graduated from Jackson-Olin High School, then attended Alabama State University on a basketball scholarship. He graduated from Miles Law School.

In 2016, attorney Charles Todd Henderson was elected as a Democrat to be the next Jefferson County District Attorney. Henderson was then indicted on felony perjury, leading to Carr’s appointment as interim District Attorney. Alabama Governor Kay Ivey later appointed Michael Anderton, a Republican prosecutor in the district attorney's office, as the next Jefferson County District Attorney. Local activists previously petitioned the Governor to not remove Carr, a Democrat, from the seat.

A career Jefferson County prosecutor and criminal justice reformer, Carr was the victorious Democratic nominee for Jefferson County District Attorney in the November 6, 2018 general election, defeating Anderton.  Carr took office on November 27, 2018.

References

Living people
1970 births
Lawyers from Birmingham, Alabama
People from Ensley, Alabama
District attorneys in Alabama
African-American lawyers
Alabama State University alumni
Miles Law School alumni
Alabama Democrats
21st-century African-American people
20th-century African-American people